Aleksandar Knjazev is a Macedonian professional basketball coach and former player. He spent most of his playing career in KK Rabotnički Skopje, and as a team leader he helped its promotion to the First Yugoslav Basketball League in 1964. He was the first coach of the Macedonia national basketball team after the country's independence in 1992.

His son Gjorgji Knjazev was also a basketball player.

References

1939 births
Living people
Macedonian basketball coaches
Place of birth missing (living people)